Nightshade, fully titled Nightshade Part 1: The Claws of Sutekh onscreen, is an action-adventure video game released in 1992 for the Nintendo Entertainment System. It was developed by Beam Software and published by Ultra Games. The game was meant to be the first part in a series, but no sequels were ever made; however, it served as the basis for Beam Software's Super NES video game adaptation of Shadowrun. It was released on the Nintendo Switch for Nintendo Switch Online subscribers in December 2020.

Plot 
The game takes place in a fictional urban city called Metro City. As the story unfolds, the city's local superhero named Vortex is outnumbered by gangs and killed. With the city's protector murdered, crime grows rapidly. Soon enough, the city's crime lords start fighting over control of the city, until a villain named Waldo P. Schmeer (More commonly known as Sutekh) takes control, combining all the gangs into one. With the city completely overrun by Sutekh and the other crime lords (Rat King, Goliath, Lord Muck, and Ninja Mistress), it is soon devoured in crime. A vigilante named Mark (alias Nightshade) decides to step up and take the law into his own hands, vowing to rid Metro City of crime.

Outside of the occasional violence, the game is actually somewhat light in tone (even Nightshade himself is constantly being called "Lampshade" or "Nightcart" by everybody) and rife with various popular culture references. The ending gives credit to people for the "bad jokes."

Gameplay 
The game had a unique feature; along with the action sequences and point-and-click game elements, there was a "popularity meter" that would go up or down as Nightshade performed good deeds well or poorly. Higher popularity meant greater recognition by everyday citizens of Metro City and allowed Nightshade access to more areas. The game also included fighting segments that required quick button responses.

Instead of a save feature or extra lives, the villain Sutekh would throw Nightshade into a deathtrap. The first four traps each had a solution and Nightshade would escape back onto the streets of Metro City (minus some popularity points). The final one does not, and the player would have to start over from the beginning of the game. Additionally the game begins with Nightshade tied to a chair, next to which Sutekh has placed a small bomb. While technically not a deathtrap (the bomb, if not escaped on time, does not do lethal damage) this introduces the trap-escape/problem-solving element early on.

Reception 
The game was received poorly for its complicated, yet not adjustable controls.

References

External links 
 

1992 video games
Action-adventure games
Nintendo Entertainment System games
North America-exclusive video games
Organized crime video games
Piko Interactive games
Superhero video games
Video games developed in Australia
Vigilante characters in video games
Nintendo Switch Online games